Vietnam Syndrome is a term in U.S. politics that refers to public aversion to American overseas military involvements after the domestic controversy over the Vietnam War. In 1973, the U.S. ended combat operations in Vietnam.  Since the early 1980s, the combination of public opinion that is biased against war, ending the active use of military conscription, a relative reluctance to deploy ground troops, and "Vietnam paralysis", are all the perceived results of Vietnam Syndrome.

Failure in Vietnam
In the domestic debate over the reasons for the US being unable to defeat North Vietnamese forces during the war, conservative thinkers, many of whom were in the US military, argued that the US had sufficient resources but that the war effort had been undermined at home. In an article in Commentary, "Making the World Safe for Communism," the journalist Norman Podhoretz stated:

Do we lack power?... Certainly not if power is measured in brute terms of economic, technological, and military capacity. By those standards, we are still the most powerful country in the world.... The issue boils down in the end, then, to the question of will.

The term "Vietnam Syndrome" thereafter proliferated in the press and policy circles as a way of explaining the United States, one of the world's superpowers, failing to repel North Vietnam's invasion of South Vietnam. Many hawkish conservatives such as Ronald Reagan agreed with Podhoretz.  In time, the term "Vietnam Syndrome" expanded as a shorthand for the idea that Americans were worried they would never win a war again and that their nation was in utter decline.

In the fall of 1983, President Reagan put his beliefs into action by ordering the invasion of Grenada. A long-simmering internal leadership dispute within the ruling Marxist-Leninist party on the Eastern Caribbean island had suddenly spun out of control, leading to political executions and innocent civilian deaths in the capital city on Oct. 19. Reagan was persuaded that swift American military action was necessary to protect about 1,000 American residents on the microstate, and also to restore Westminster-style democracy and end growing Soviet Bloc influence over the former British colony. Reagan pushed past the hesitancy of the Pentagon leadership, and the expected domestic and international blowback, to authorize a surprise U.S.-led intervention at dawn on Oct. 25. His presidential directive specifically instructed the Pentagon to take strict secrecy measures to head off any pre-emptive action by the Cubans or the Soviets. "Frankly, there was another reason I wanted secrecy," Reagan later confided in his autobiography. "It was what I call the 'post-Vietnam syndrome,' the resistance of so many in Congress to the use of military force abroad for any reason, because of our nation's experience in Vietnam.... I suspected that if we told the leaders of Congress about the operation, even under terms of the strictest confidentiality, there would be someone who would leak it to the press together with the prediction that Grenada was going to become 'another Vietnam.'.... We didn't ask anybody, we just did it."

Ronald Reagan's speech to Veterans of Foreign Wars
In the later 1970s and the 1980s, Ronald Reagan talked about the aspects of the Vietnam Syndrome but argued that it could be overcome if Americans adopted a more confident and optimistic posture in the world, with him as leader. In the speech to the Veterans of Foreign Wars (VFW), which used the term "Vietnam syndrome", Reagan alleged that the time was right for such a change of attitude and action since the Soviet Union was outspending the US in the global arms race such that the latter's global power was decreasing. He accused the Carter administration of being "totally oblivious" to the Soviet threat.

Asserting a need for a more aggressive and activist foreign policy, Reagan also suggested that Americans could have defeated the Viet Cong and the North Vietnamese Army, alleged that the American public had turned against the war from the influence of North Vietnamese propaganda, and implied that officials had let down the soldiers and had been "afraid to let them win" the war.

Reagan equated the "Vietnam syndrome" with a reluctance on the part of the American public to support US military interventions but also with feelings of guilt about the devastation brought about because of the Vietnam War and with feelings of doubt over the morality of America's intentions and actions during the war. Reagan, however, argued that America had fought for "a noble cause" and blamed the war in Vietnam exclusively on North Vietnam's aggression:

Burial of syndrome by military actions
The Reagan administration hoped that the success of the invasion of Grenada would help dispel the Vietnam Syndrome so that the American public could be successfully galvanized to support new US military actions, with President Reagan declaring after the invasion, "Our days of weakness are over. Our military forces are back on their feet and standing tall."

The quick victory during the First Gulf War was widely believed to be the end of the Vietnam Syndrome. US President George H. W. Bush triumphantly declared after the war, "The ghosts of Vietnam have been laid to rest beneath the sands of the Arabian desert."

Bosnian War
"Lift and strike" was a proposed policy by the Clinton administration in 1993, which Bill Clinton had supported during his successful presidential campaign in 1992. The policy sought to improve the chances of a political settlement in the bloody atrocity-filled Bosnian War in the former Yugoslavia by lifting the arms embargo, arming the Bosniaks (Bosnian Muslims), and striking at the Bosnian Serbs if they resisted the rearmament project. A combination of the Vietnam Syndrome and very strong opposition from American allies in Europe killed the proposal, which was never enacted.

See also
 Anti-communism
 Vietnam stab-in-the-back myth
 War-weariness
 Post-traumatic stress disorder

References

Vietnam War
Foreign relations of the United States
Aftermath of the Vietnam War
Public opinion in the United States
Anti-war movement